Sebastian Rudy (born 28 February 1990) is a German professional footballer who plays as a midfielder for Bundesliga club 1899 Hoffenheim. He represented the Germany national team.

Club career

VfB Stuttgart
Rudy joined VfB Stuttgart's youth academy in 2003 and started his senior career in 2007 with the club's reserve team, playing in the semi-professional Regionalliga Süd. He made his professional debut with the same team in the newly established 3. Liga on 2 August 2008 against Union Berlin.

During the summer of 2008, he also signed a contract with VfB Stuttgart's first team, for which he made his competitive debut in the first round of the DFB-Pokal on 10 August 2008 in their 5–0 away victory over Hansa Lüneburg.

1899 Hoffenheim
Rudy moved to 1899 Hoffenheim in 2010. On 28 August 2010, Rudy made his debut in a Bundesliga match as a substitute by replacing Peniel Mlapa in the 89th minute in a 1–0 victory over St. Pauli. On 5 February 2011, he scored his first goal for the club in a 3–2 victory over 1. FC Kaiserslautern.

Bayern Munich

On 15 January 2017, Rudy was transferred to Bayern Munich on 1 July 2017 after his Hoffenheim contract expired. On 6 August 2017, Rudy made his debut in a 5–4 penalty-shootout victory over Borussia Dortmund in the 2017 DFL-Supercup. In his first Bundesliga match with the club, he provided an assist from the free-kick to his fellow Bayern newcomer and his former Hoffenheim teammate Niklas Süle in a 3–1 win over Bayer Leverkusen. Rudy scored his first goal for Bayern Munich in a 3–0 victory over Hannover in the Bundesliga.

Schalke 04

On 27 August 2018, Rudy joined Schalke 04 on a four-year deal, for an undisclosed fee.

Return to 1899 Hoffenheim on loan
On 31 July 2019, Rudy returned to Hoffenheim on a season-long loan deal. On 5 October 2020, he was again loaned to Hoffenheim until the end of the 2020–21 season.

On 16 June 2021, Rudy was released from his contract with Schalke 04.

1899 Hoffenheim 

On 28 June 2021, Rudy signed a two-year contract with Hoffenheim.

International career
Rudy debuted for the German senior team on 13 May 2014 in a friendly against Poland in Hamburg. On 6 October 2017, Rudy scored his first international goal from outside the box in a 3–1 victory over Northern Ireland and it was Germany's fastest goal in World Cup qualifiers which was scored in the 2nd minute of the match.

On 4 June 2018, Rudy was named in Joachim Löw's final 23-man squad for the 2018 FIFA World Cup.

Career statistics

Club

International

Honours
Bayern Munich
 Bundesliga: 2017–18
 DFL-Supercup: 2017, 2018

Germany U17
 FIFA U-17 World Cup third place: 2007

Germany
FIFA Confederations Cup: 2017

Individual
Fritz Walter Medal U18 Silver Medal: 2008

References

External links

1990 births
Living people
People from Villingen-Schwenningen
Sportspeople from Freiburg (region)
Footballers from Baden-Württemberg
German footballers
Germany youth international footballers
Germany under-21 international footballers
Germany international footballers
Association football defenders
Association football midfielders
VfB Stuttgart players
VfB Stuttgart II players
TSG 1899 Hoffenheim players
FC Bayern Munich footballers
FC Schalke 04 players
Regionalliga players
3. Liga players
Bundesliga players
2017 FIFA Confederations Cup players
2018 FIFA World Cup players
FIFA Confederations Cup-winning players